The William E. Massey, Sr., Lectures in the History of American Civilization is a series of public lectures held every one or two years at Harvard University since 1984. They are sponsored by the university's Program in the History of American Civilization. They were endowed by an anonymous donor in honor of William E. Massey, former president of the A.T. Massey Coal Company.

Lecturers
1984 - Eudora Welty, One Writer's Beginnings
1986 - Irving Howe, The American Newness: Culture and Politics in the Age of Emerson
1988 - Lawrence W. Levine, Highbrow/Lowbrow: The Emergence of Cultural Hierarchy in America
1988 - Conor Cruise O'Brien, God Land: Reflections on Religion and Nationalism
1990 - David Brion Davis, Revolutions: Reflections on American Equality and Foreign Liberations
1992 - Toni Morrison, Playing in the Dark: Whiteness and the Literary Imagination
1992 - Gore Vidal, Screening History
1994 - Eugene D. Genovese, The Southern Tradition
1995 - Alfred Kazin, Writing Was Everything
1996 - Stephen L. Carter, The Dissent of the Governed: A Meditation on Law, Religion, and Loyalty
1997 - Richard Rorty, Achieving Our Country: Leftist Thought in Twentieth-Century America
1999 - Andrew Delbanco, The Real American Dream: A Meditation on Hope
2000 - Maxine Hong Kingston To Be The Poet
2003 - E. L. Doctorow, Reporting the Universe
2004 - Robert Venturi and Denise Scott Brown, Architecture as Signs and Systems: For A Mannerist Time
2004 - John Demos, Circles and Lines: The Shape of Life in Early America
2005 - Jayati Ghosh, The Economics of the American Empire: Fierceness and Fragility
2008 - Joan C. Williams, Obama Eats Arugula: Reshaping the Electoral and Everyday Politics of Work and Family
2009 - Eric Foner, The Fiery Trial:  Abraham Lincoln and American Slavery
2011 - Sally Mann, If Memory Serves
2012 - Gish Jen, Tiger Writing: Art, Culture and the Interdependent Self
2013 - Greil Marcus, Three Songs, Three Singers, Three Nations
2015 - Linda Greenhouse, Just a Journalist: Reflections on Journalism, Life, and the Spaces Between
2017 - Winona LaDuke, Climate Change, Indigenous Resistance, and Forging a New Democracy: Thoughts for the Present Moment

Notes

External links
About the Massey Lectures American Studies, Graduate School of Arts and Sciences, Harvard University
Past Massey Lectures and Books, covering lectures from 1984 to 2003.
Harvard University
Lecture series